The Northern Cricket Union (NCU) Senior League is the provincial cricket league within the NCU jurisdiction in Ireland, which covers counties Antrim, Armagh, Down and south Tyrone of Northern Ireland. The league was formed in 1897 and is currently divided into four sections, namely the Premier League, Sections 1, 2 and 3. It is sponsored by Robinson Services and marketed as the Robinson Services Premier League, Robinson Services Section 1, etc.

There are a total of 32 league members: ten in the Premier League; ten in League 1; and twelve in League 2. There is promotion and relegation of two clubs between each division.

Teams play each other twice per season, once at home and once away, each season, with four points awarded for a win and two for a tie or for "no result". When two or more teams finish with the same number of points, the team with the best net run rate is placed highest. Matches consist of one innings per side, with a maximum of fifty, and a minimum of twenty overs bowled per innings.

Waringstown are the most successful side in the Premier League with 31 wins (6 shared) and the current champions are Lisburn after winning the 2022 competition. This was their first title since 1993

In 2020, the season was abridged due to the coronavirus pandemic and the Premier League was played as a single round of fixtures with the top four teams progressing to semi-finals and the champions declared after a final.

Members for 2022 season

Source: Northern Cricket Union

List of champions

Performance by club

Summary of winners

See also
NCU Challenge Cup
NCU Junior Cup
Irish Senior Cup
Leinster Senior League
Ulster Cup
North West Senior League

References

CricketEurope

External links
 Northern Cricket Union

Senior cricket leagues in Ireland
Cricket in Ulster